A list of the species of Hymenoptera from New Zealand; currently listing the 'stinging wasps' (Aculeata), which includes ants, bees, and social wasps.

Apidae 

Apis mellifera Linnaeus 1758; Deliberate Introduction

Bombus hortorum (Linnaeus 1761); Deliberate Introduction

Bombus ruderatus (Fabricius 1775); Deliberate Introduction

Bombus subterraneus (Linnaeus 1758); Deliberate Introduction

Bombus terrestris (Linnaeus 1758); Deliberate Introduction

Bethylidae 

Apenesia harrisi Ward 2013; Endemic

Austranesia tofti (Ward 2013); Endemic

Cephalonomia pinkfloydi Ward 2013; Endemic

Chilepyris platythelys Sorg & Walker 1989; Accidental Introduction

Epyris tricristata (Ward 2013); Endemic

Eupsenella insulana Gordh & Harris 1996; Endemic

Goniozus jacintae Farrugia 1981; Accidental Introduction

Goniozus jamiei Ward 2013; Endemic

Goniozus musae Ward 2013; Endemic

Laelius macfarlanei Ward 2013; Endemic

Parascleroderma azevedonis Ward 2013; Endemic

Plastanoxus laevis (Ashmead 1893); Accidental Introduction

Pseudoisobrachium beggsae (Ward 2013); Endemic

Sclerodermus niveifemur (Evans 1964); Accidental Introduction

Sierola berryae Ward 2013; Endemic

Sierola gilbertae Ward 2013; Endemic

Sierola houdiniae Magnacca 2019; Endemic

Sierola lucyae Ward 2013; Endemic

Sierola thorpei Magnacca 2019; Accidental Introduction

Sierola vibrissata Ward 2013; Endemic

Colletidae 
Euryglossina hypochroma Cockerell 1916; Accidental Introduction

Euryglossina proctotrypoides Cockerell 1913; Accidental Introduction

Hylaeus agilis (Smith 1876); Endemic

Hylaeus asperithorax (Rayment 1927); Accidental Introduction

Hylaeus capitosus (Smith 1876); Endemic

Hylaeus kermadecensis Donovan 2007; Endemic

Hylaeus matamoko Donovan 2007; Endemic

Hylaeus murihiku Donovan 2007; Endemic

Hylaeus perhumilis (Cockerell 1914); Accidental Introduction

Hylaeus relegatus (Smith 1876); Endemic

Hyleoides concinna (Fabricius 1775); Accidental Introduction

Leioproctus boltoni Cockerell 1904; Endemic

Leioproctus huakiwi Donovan 2007; Endemic

Leioproctus hukarere Donovan 2016; Endemic

Leioproctus imitatus Smith 1853; Endemic

Leioproctus kanapuu Donovan 2007; Endemic

Leioproctus keehua Donovan 2007; Endemic

Leioproctus metallicus (Smith 1853); Endemic

Leioproctus pango Donovan 2007; Endemic

Leioproctus purpureus (Smith 1853); Endemic

Leioproctus vestitus (Smith 1876); Endemic

Leioproctus waipounamu Donovan 2007; Endemic

Nesocolletes fulvescens (Smith 1876); Endemic

Nesocolletes hudsoni (Cockerell 1925); Endemic

Nesocolletes maritimus (Cockerell 1936); Endemic

Nesocolletes monticola (Cockerell 1925); Endemic

Nesocolletes nunui Donovan 2007; Endemic

Nesocolletes paahaumaa Donovan 2007; Endemic

Nesocolletes pekanui Donovan 2007; Endemic

Crabronidae 
Argogorytes carbonarius (Smith 1856); Endemic

Pison marginatum Smith 1856; Accidental Introduction

Pison morosum Smith 1856; Endemic

Pison peletieri Le Guillou 1841; Accidental Introduction

Pison spinolae Shuckard 1837; Accidental Introduction

Podagritus albipes (Smith 1878); Endemic

Podagritus carbonicolor (Dalla Torre 1897); Endemic

Podagritus chambersi Harris 1994; Endemic

Podagritus cora (Cameron 1888); Endemic

Podagritus digyalos Harris 1994; Endemic

Podagritus parrotti (Leclercq 1955); Endemic

Rhopalum aucklandi Leclercq 1955; Endemic

Rhopalum perforator Smith 1876; Endemic

Rhopalum zelandum Leclercq 1955; Endemic

Spilomena earlyi Harris 1994; Endemic

Spilomena elegantula Turner 1916; Endemic

Spilomena emarginata Vardy 1987; Endemic

Spilomena nozela Vardy 1987; Endemic

Tachysphex nigerrimus (Smith 1856); Endemic

Dryinidae 
Anteon bribianum Olmi 1987; Native

Anteon caledonianum Olmi 1984; Native

Bocchus thorpei Olmi 2007; Accidental Introduction

Dryinus koebelei (Perkins 1905); Endemic

Gonatopus alpinus (Gourlay 1954); Endemic

Gonatopus zealandicus Olmi 1984; Endemic

Embolemidae 
Embolemus zealandicus Olmi 1996; Endemic

Formicidae 
Amblyopone australis Erichson 1842; Accidental Introduction

Austroponera castanea (Mayr 1865); Endemic

Austroponera castaneicolor (Dalla Torre 1893); Endemic

Cardiocondyla minutior Forel 1899; Accidental Introduction

Chelaner antarcticus F. Smith 1858; Endemic

Chelaner smithii Forel 1892; Endemic

Discothyrea antarctica Emery 1895; Endemic

Doleromyrma darwiniana (Forel 1907); Accidental Introduction

Fulakora saundersi (Forel 1892); Endemic

Heteroponera brouni (Forel 1892); Endemic

Huberia brounii Forel 1895; Endemic

Huberia striata (Smith 1876); Endemic

Hypoponera confinis (Roger 1860); Accidental Introduction

Hypoponera eduardi (Forel 1894); Accidental Introduction

Hypoponera punctatissima (Roger 1859); Accidental Introduction

Iridomyrmex suchieri Forel 1907; Accidental Introduction

Linepithema humile (Mayr 1868); Accidental Introduction

Mayriella abstinens Forel 1902; Accidental Introduction

Monomorium antipodum Forel 1901; Accidental Introduction

Monomorium pharaonis (Linnaeus 1758); Accidental Introduction

Monomorium sydneyense Forel 1902; Accidental Introduction

Myrmecorhynchus novaeseelandiae Kaulfuss & Dlussky 2015; Fossil

Nylanderia braueri glabrior (Forel 1902); Accidental Introduction

Nylanderia tasmaniensis (Forel 1913); Accidental Introduction

Ochetellus glaber (Mayr 1862); Accidental Introduction

Orectognathus antennatus Smith 1853; Accidental Introduction

Plagiolepis alluaudi Emery 1894; Accidental Introduction

Pheidole megacephala (Fabricius 1793); Accidental Introduction

Pheidole proxima Mayr 1876; Accidental Introduction

Pheidole rugosula Forel 1902; Accidental Introduction

Pheidole vigilans (Smith 1858); Accidental Introduction

Ponera leae Forel 1913; Accidental Introduction

Prolasius advenus (Smith 1862); Endemic

Rhytidoponera chalybaea Emery 1901; Accidental Introduction

Rhytidoponera gibsoni Kaulfuss & Dlussky 2015; Fossil

Rhytidoponera metallica (Smith 1858); Accidental Introduction

Rhytidoponera waipiata Kaulfuss & Dlussky 2015; Fossil

Solenopsis sp; Accidental Introduction

Strumigenys perplexa (Smith 1876); Accidental Introduction

Strumigenys xenos Brown 1955; Accidental Introduction

Technomyrmex jocosus Forel 1910; Accidental Introduction

Tetramorium bicarinatum (Nylander 1846); Accidental Introduction

Tetramorium grassii Emery 1895; Accidental Introduction

Halictidae 
Lasioglossum cognatum  (Smith 1853); Accidental Introduction

Lasioglossum mataroa  Donovan 2007; Endemic

Lasioglossum maunga Donovan 2007; Endemic

Lasioglossum sordidum (Smith 1853); Endemic

Nomia melanderi Cockerell 1906; Deliberate Introduction

Mutillidae 
Ephutomorpha bivulnerata (André 1901); Accidental Introduction

Pompilidae 

Cryptocheilus australis (Guérin 1830); Accidental Introduction

Epipompilus insularis Kohl 1884; Endemic

Priocnemis carbonarius Smith 1855; Endemic

Priocnemis conformis Smith 1876; Endemic

Priocnemis crawi Harris 1987; Endemic

Priocnemis monachus (Smith 1855); Endemic

Priocnemis nitidiventris Smith 1878; Endemic

Priocnemis ordishi Harris 1987; Endemic

Sphictostethus calvus Harris 1987; Endemic

Sphictostethus fugax (Fabricius 1775); Endemic

Sphictostethus nitidus (Fabricius 1775); Endemic; the golden hunter wasp

Scolebythidae 
Ycaploca sp.; Accidental Introduction

Scoliidae 
Radumeris tasmaniensis (Saussure 1854); Accidental Introduction

Sphecidae 
Podalonia tydei suspiciosa (Smith 1856); Accidental Introduction

Vespidae 
Ancistrocerus gazella (Panzer 1798); Accidental Introduction

Paralastor sp.; Accidental Introduction

Polistes chinensis antennalis Perez 1905; Accidental Introduction

Polistes dominula (Christ 1791); Accidental Introduction

Polistes humilis (Fabricius 1781); Accidental Introduction

Vespula germanica (Fabricius 1793); Accidental Introduction

Vespula vulgaris (Linnaeus 1758); Accidental Introduction

References